Clube Sportivo Capelense was a Brazilian football club based in Capela, Alagoas. The team last participated in the Campeonato Alagoano Segunda Divisão in the 2011 season. 

They competed in the Copa do Brasil once and twice in the Taça Brasil.

History
The club was founded on 19 May 1945. They won the Campeonato Alagoano in 1959, 1962 and in 1989. The club participated in the Taça Brasil in 1960, when they were defeated in the Northeastern Final to Bahia, and competed again in 1963. Capelense competed in the Copa do Brasil in 1990, when they were eliminated in the First Round by Flamengo. The club won the Campeonato Alagoano Second Level in 2008.

Achievements
 Campeonato Alagoano:
 Winners (3): 1959, 1962, 1989
 Campeonato Alagoano Second Level:
 Winners (1): 2008

Stadium
Centro Sportivo Capelense play their home games at Estádio Manoel Moreira. The stadium has a maximum capacity of 5,000 people.

References

Association football clubs established in 1945
Defunct football clubs in Alagoas
1945 establishments in Brazil